Enrique Franco Aguilar (Mazatlán, 19 December 1938) is a Mexican-born naturalized American songwriter.

Franco is known for avoiding, and being critical of, the narcocorrido genre.

References

Date of birth unknown
Living people
Mexican emigrants to the United States
American male songwriters
1938 births